Gaku Ito (born March 6, 1960 in Saitama Prefecture, Japan) is a Japanese politician who has served as a member of the House of Councillors of Japan since 2019. He represents the Saitama at-large district and is a member of the Japanese Communist Party.

References 

Living people
1960 births
21st-century Japanese politicians
Members of the House of Councillors (Japan)
Politicians from Saitama Prefecture
Japanese Communist Party politicians